Higley Falls Reservoir, also known as Higley Flow, is a man-made lake located on the Raquette River between Colton and South Colton, New York. Fish species present in the reservoir are smallmouth bass, northern pike, black bullhead, and walleye. There is a concrete ramp boat launch located in Higley Flow State Park.

References 

Lakes of New York (state)